Marguerite Frédérique Charlaix (1883-1939) was a French painter from the École de Lyon who specialised in landscapes and still lifes.  She was the daughter of painter Léon Charlaix.
 
Charlaix moved to Lyon in 1900 to study with Jean-Louis Loubet (1841-1903), the painter, enamelist and sculptor Robert Barriot (1898-1970) and painter Pierre Bonnaud (1865-1930).

She exhibited at the Société Lyonnaise de Beaux-Arts.  In 1902 she was a founding member of the Salon d'automne de Lyon where she became an exhibitor too. In 1904 she started exhibiting at the Société des Artistes Indépendants, and in 1921 at the Salon d'Automne, in Paris. In 1933 she sent her works to the Salon du Sud-Est.

In 1932 she illustrated "La masque de Lyon" by Cabanes.  In 1937 "Dame Loyse, la Belle Cordière" by Joseph Trillat.

When she died in 1939 a rare book titled "12 bois gravés de Frédérique Charlaix" was published. It includes an introduction by Henri Focillon (1888-1943), an art historian who was the director of the Museum of Fine Arts of Lyon.

Notes

Sources 
 Elisabeth Hardouin-Fugier, Etienne Grafe: "La peinture lyonnaise au XIXe siècle", Editions de l'amateur, 1995, p. 297
 Bernard Gouttenoire: "Dictionnaire des peintres & sculpteurs à Lyon aux XIXe & XXe siècles", Ed. la Taillanderie, 2000
 "Nouvelles de l'estampe", Issues 185-190, Comité national de la gravure française, 2003, pp 58 & 59
 Yvanohé Rambosson, Frédérique Charlaix:  catalogue of "Le Salon d'automne, Artistes lyonnais, 1926, Palais Municipal des Expositions, Quai de Bondy", Société du Salon d'automne, 1926
 Frédéric Dard:  "Reportage sur le XVème Salon du Sud-Est"

1883 births
1939 deaths
Artists from Saint-Étienne
20th-century French painters
20th-century French women artists